Although, in modern usage, the word “nitre” (alternatively spelt “niter”) usually refers to the mineral form of potassium nitrate, it may also refer to a variety of other minerals and chemical compounds, including
potassium carbonate
sodium carbonate
sodium nitrate

See also Nitraria billardierei, found in Australia and also called Nitre Bush.